The Embassy of Venezuela in London is the diplomatic mission of Venezuela in the United Kingdom. Venezuela also maintains a building on Grafton Way, Fitzrovia housing the Consular and Cultural Secttions as well as the Defence Attaché's Office.

Gallery

References

External links

Official site

Venezuela
Diplomatic missions of Venezuela
United Kingdom–Venezuela relations
Buildings and structures in the Royal Borough of Kensington and Chelsea
Buildings and structures in the City of Westminster
South Kensington